Lebanon is a town in Russell County, Virginia, United States. The population was 3,424 at the 2010 census. It is the county seat of Russell County.

History 
The town of Lebanon was founded in 1818 as per an effort to create a new county seat for Russell County. The Lebanon Lutheran Church was founded in 1851 by pastor Jacob Scherer.

Geography
According to the United States Census Bureau, the town has a total area of 4.1 square miles (10.6 km2), all of it land.

Climate
The town has a humid subtropical climate (Köppen climate classification Cfa). The Trewartha climate classification is temperate oceanic due to five months of winter chill (monthly means below 10 °C (50 °F)), abbreviated "Do" on climate maps.

Demographics

As of the census of 2010, there were 3,424 people, 1,507 households, and 884 families living in the town. The population density was 835.1 people per square mile (323.0/km2). There were 1,681 housing units at an average density of 410.0 per square mile (158.6/km2). The racial makeup of the town was 94.7% White, 2.9% African American, 0.3% Native American, 0.5% from other races, and 0.8% from two or more races. Hispanic or Latino of any race were 1.4% of the population.

There were 1,507 households, out of which 23.7% had children under the age of 18 living with them, 41.0% were married couples living together, 14.1% had a female householder with no husband present, and 41.3% were non-families. 36.5% of all households were made up of individuals, and 16.9% had someone living alone who was 65 years of age or older. The average household size was 2.17 and the average family size was 2.84.

In the town, the population was spread out, with 21.0% under the age of 18, 5.9% from 20 to 24, 25.9% from 25 to 44, 24.8% from 45 to 64, and 20.0% who were 65 years of age or older. The median age was 41 years. For every 100 females, there were 86.9 males. For every 100 females age 18 and over, there were 82.6 males.

The median income for a household in the town was $24,272, and the median income for a family was $47,708. Males had a median income of $42,404 versus $37,900 for females. The per capita income for the town was $23,822. About 25.9% of families and 28.8% of the population were below the poverty line, including 40.0% of those under age 18 and 11.9% of those age 65 or over.

Arts and culture
Sites in Lebanon listed on the National Register of Historic Places include
Blackford Bridge, Carter Hill, Daugherty's Cave and Breeding Site, Samuel Gilmer House, and Stephen B. Quillen House.

Lebanon is the location of the only Bonanza restaurant in the Southern United States, out of four in the country.

References

Towns in Russell County, Virginia
Towns in Virginia
County seats in Virginia